Outlaws of the Leopolds is a 1952 non-fiction history book by Ion Idriess. It concerned the aboriginal resistance leader Sandamara in the 1890s.

References

External links
Outlaws of the Leopolds at AustLit
Extracts published in the Sun Herald - 14 Dec 1952, 21 Dec 1952, 28 Dec 1952, 4 Jan 1953, 11 Jan 1953, 18 Jan 1953, 25 Jan 1953, 1 Feb 1953 

1952 non-fiction books
Books by Ion Idriess
1890s in Australia
Australian non-fiction books
Books about Indigenous Australians
Angus & Robertson books